The Ordinance of the Staple was an ordinance issued in the Great Council in October 1353.  It aimed to regularise the status of staple ports in England, Wales, and Ireland.  In particular, it designated particular ports where specific goods could be exported or imported. These were called the 'staple ports'.  It also established dedicated courts, known as the courts of staple, where disputes relating to commercial matters could be heard, in preference to the courts of common law.

There were two immediately prior assemblies in August 1352 and July 1353 at which it is thought the matter of Staples was discussed. The scheme for home town staples was vetted by the more parliamentary assembly in September 1353. Royal officials had already been appointed on 10 July 1353 to run the scheme when the parliament of 1354 confirmed the new scheme by that the Act of Parliament. The previous act in 1326 had given the Staple towns legal definition, but the new piece of legislation broadened and widened their trading privileges.  The Act facilitated mercantile credit to promote trade (which supported by a sympathetic King Edward, was also the constitutional duty of the Commons).  It highlighted the weakness of 14th-century debt system, and the need to regulate trade to improve liquidity, after the economic crisis caused by the Black Death.

The staple towns named in the statute were at Newcastle upon Tyne, York, Lincoln, Norwich, Westminster, Canterbury, Chichester, Winchester, Exeter, and Bristol, in England, as well as Dublin, Waterford, Cork, and Drogheda in Ireland.  In Wales the designated staple town was Carmarthen.  From 1368, the wool staple was transferred away from Canterbury to Queenborough, in Kent.

In 1363 the merchants from the staples of York and Bristol founded a new staple at Calais. The merchants had established a near monopoly, and in 1353 were banned from exporting to England.  In response in collaboration with the English Crown, the merchants guilds of these two well-established centres decided to organize a new market centre for wool in Bruges.  They persistently petitioned parliament to establish "the freedom of trade" in cloth to Flanders, as a matter of principle.  Conveniently the last Bruges monopoly company had been declared bankrupt in 1351.  King Edward, whose queen emanated from Hainault, wished for both a diplomatic, commercial and military alliance against France.  The Burgesses of the Commons welcomed the King's interest and approved the Staples transfer of trading rights to Bruges.  The collapse of available labour supply increased awareness of trade regulation, and the need to control fraud, implied for England imposition of customs duties at given ports.  In the interest of "the community realm" the Chief Justice designated it in the interest of the common law that free trade flourish.

See also
 The Staple, for the medieval use of the term
 Chapter 10, dealing with measurement fraud

References

Bibliography

External links
 Ordinance and Statute of the Staple
 http://www.legislation.gov.uk/ukpga/1825/50/pdfs/ukpga_18250050_en.pdf?timeline=true

Acts of the Parliament of England
1350s in England
1350s in law
Hanseatic League
Economy of medieval England
Medieval economics
Staple ports
1353 in Europe